Lefevrea carpenteri is a species of leaf beetle of the Republic of the Congo, the Democratic Republic of the Congo, Uganda, Rwanda, Ivory Coast and Cameroon. It was first described by the British entomologist Gilbert Ernest Bryant in 1932, from specimens collected by the British entomologist Geoffrey Douglas Hale Carpenter from Gulu, Uganda in 1925.

References 

Eumolpinae
Beetles of Africa
Beetles of the Democratic Republic of the Congo
Insects of the Republic of the Congo
Insects of Uganda
Insects of Rwanda
Insects of West Africa
Insects of Cameroon
Beetles described in 1932